Superhero Scramble was a superhero themed obstacle race series that has several levels of races. The majority of participants participate for fun, while others compete for team and individual prize money that's available at each event. Participants frequently dress in costumes based on characters from video games, movies, cartoons, and comic books.  The all-day events included live bands, DJ's, emcees, entertainers, food and beer. There were also night races and kids races.

History 

The Superhero Scramble was founded in June, 2011, in Boca Raton, Florida by Sean O'Connor.  The first event occurred on November 12, 2011 at Quiet Waters Park in Deerfield Beach, and attracted nearly 2000 people. Three more events took place in Florida during the next twelve months, and subsequently the group has organized national level events across the US. Men and women participate about equally in the races, and both young and older adults take part.

After 2013, the Superhero Scramble, as well as several other obstacle races, had some financial trouble because fewer people were signing up to participate.  The final races were plagued with low volunteer and support turnout, and the remaining scheduled races were canceled. Participants were not given refunds.

Course 

Superhero Scramble race courses vary in distance and difficulty from four mile "Charger" courses, to eight mile "Intimidator" courses, as well as thirteen mile (half marathon) "Villain" and the 26 mile (marathon) "Super Villain." Projected finishing times for the events range from 30 minutes to 12 hours, depending on the particular course and fitness level of the racer. Race venues have included ski slopes, state parks, paint ball parks, off-road parks, and more. Any competitor who completes all three race distances within a 12-month period is eligible to receive special designation as a "Superhero Legend."

Obstacles 
The Superhero Scramble races include a variety of obstacles including the Leap of Faith jump, The Beast climbing wall, the Spiderweb ropes course, the Real Barbed Wire, the Top of the World Container Crossing, the Dumpster Divin ice bath, the Super Slime Slide and several mud slides.

Scramble Gamble 

The Scramble Gamble allows participants to win a cash prize whereby half the entrance fees are given to charity and the remaining half split between the top 3 finishers.

Charitable Partnership 

Superhero Scramble supports Forgotten Soldiers Outreach (FSO), which was founded in 2003 to send monthly "We Care" packages to U.S. servicemen and servicewomen abroad. To date, FSO has benefited over 250,000 military personnel serving abroad, covering ALL world theaters.

Night Waves 

In July, 2012 in Waldo, Fl, Superhero Scramble held its first night waves.  Races where participants ran the same course that was set up during the day, navigating by way of the moonlight and their headlamps.

Super Kids Race 

Kids can run their own version of the Superhero Scramble. The course is estimated to be 1 mile long and with 5 or more obstacles. Age groups of 4-8 and 9-13 run together. Parents are encouraged to run with their children.  Participants receive a medal, a sticker and a temporary tattoo.

Past events

See also 

Hobie Call
Obstacle Racing
Tough Mudder
Spartan Race
Warrior Dash

References

External links 

 Official Website
 Official Facebook Page
 Forgotten Soldiers Outreach

Superhero Scramble 

Obstacle racing
2011 establishments in the United States